Delray is the name of several communities in the United States of America:

Delray, Georgia
Delray, Detroit, Michigan
Delray, Texas
Delray, West Virginia
Delray Beach, Florida
Delray Gardens, Florida
Delray Shores, Florida

See also
 Battle of Molino del Rey, inspiration for the name Delray of Detroit, in turn inspiration for the name Delray Beach, Florida
 Del Ray (disambiguation)
 Del Rey (disambiguation)
 Chevrolet Delray